West Harrison Community School District is a rural public school district headquartered in Mondamin, Iowa.

Located in sections of Harrison and Monona counties, the district serves the municipalities of Mondamin, Little Sioux, Modale, Moorhead, and Pisgah. It also serves River Sioux.

History
In the early 1960s, the district was established.

The current school building opened in 1994.

On July 1, 2004, the East Monona Community School District was dissolved, with portions going to other school districts. 33% of the former district, including the City of Moorhead, was given to West Harrison.

Schools
West Harrison Elementary
West Harrison Middle School / High School

West Harrison High School

Athletics
The Hawkeyes compete in the Rolling Valley Conference in the following sports:

Baseball
Basketball (boys and girls)
Cross Country (boys and girls)
Football
Softball
Track and Field (boys and girls)
 Boys' - 1970 Class B State Champions
Volleyball
Wrestling
Cheerleading

Fight Song

We're lo- yal to you black and white,
you're the col-ors for which we will fight!
We will al-ways stand fast, We will fight to the last,
keep-ing those col-ors float-ing free!
Go crash-ing a-head, black and white, 
you're the col-ors for which we will fight!
Our team is the stout protect-or,
our team will be the vic-tor,
Vic-t'ry to you black and white!
GO YOU HAWK-EYES   FIGHT, FIGHT, FIGHT!
vic-t'ry to you black and white!

Extracurricular Activities

Lego League
FCCLA
Speech

Academics
In 2014, West Harrison Community School District received and honor of recognition from the U.S. News & World Report in May. Out of a total of 349 schools West Harrison was selected as one on the top 98 school districts in Iowa. West Harrison was awarded a bronze placing. West Harrison made the list for due to the student teacher ratio and test score proficiency in math (91%) and reading (88%).

Enrollment

See also
List of school districts in Iowa
List of high schools in Iowa

References

External links
 West Harrison Community School District
 

School districts in Iowa
Education in Harrison County, Iowa
Education in Monona County, Iowa
1960s establishments in Iowa